Three Delivery (also known as Chop Suey Trio) is an animated television series inspired by kung-fu movies.  It was created by Larry Schwarz, who also created similar series, Kappa Mikey and Speed Racer: The Next Generation. It is a collaboration between Animation Collective in Manhattan, New York and the now-defunct Fatkat in Miramichi, New Brunswick as their last project. The show premiered on Nicktoons in the United States, and YTV in Canada on June 27, 2008.  An episode of Three Delivery was first shown at the New York Comic Con 2008, on April 19, 2008. The show was broadcast CBBC in the UK having begun on February 21, 2009 and on Once TV in Mexico.

Synopsis

Characters
Sue Yee (Stephanie Sheh): a tough girl dedicated to her friends and family.  Despite some sibling rivalry, she and her older brother Sid will do anything to protect each other.  Sue won't admit it, but she has a crush on Barney.
 Tobey Li (Robby Duncan Sharpe): a boy with a big heart and stomach and a bigger sense of humour, in spite of his dark past.  Despite his constant joking around, he loves being a superhero and will protect his friends no matter what.
 Sid Yee (Johnny Yong Bosch): a cool and composed boy with a razor sharp wit and an interest in music.  He is Sue's older brother and takes his duties as one of Chinatown's protectors seriously.
 Nana (Nancy Wu): a kind but tough old lady who is the guardian of the magic cookbook and the most formidable defence against Kong Li; she's an expert in both magic and martial arts.  She takes in Sue, Sid, and Tobey and trains them to defend Chinatown against Kong Li.  Her real name is Mei Wa and she's Mr. Wu's mother, and Barney's grandmother.
 Mr. Calvin Wu (Michael Alston Baley): the proud and boastful owner of Wu's Garden Restaurant, where Sue, Sid, and Tobey are employed as delivery people.  While he yells at his employees often for slacking off and subjects them to trying his new and unusual recipes, Mr. Wu  actually has a good heart.
 Barney Wu (David Chen): Calvin's son who has his head in the clouds and his hands in a dirty sink so often that he doesn't notice Tobey, Sid, and Sue have been protecting Chinatown.  Like his father, he has strange ideas, but a good heart.
 Kong Li (Lex Woutas): a former martial arts student who became a cruel and ambitious magician who will stop at nothing to obtain the magic cookbook.  For now, he remains trapped within the barrier around Chinatown.
 Eugene (Jamie McGonnigal): Sue, Sid and Tobey's science nerd classmate and friend.

Production

Animation Collective partnered with FatKat to guarantee more fluid, traditional-style 2D animation not usually found in Flash shows.  The backgrounds are also painted in Flash.  Schwarz was drawn to the premise, saying that he used to live near Manhattan's Chinatown himself and that this show would reflect some of his personal experiences.  Art director and former director Alan Foreman designed the visual style of the show, which he compares to a living graphic novel.  He also performs the vocals for the theme song and contributes to the score, with his New York-based, indie-rock band Ten Minute Turns.

Promotion for the show began with the studio making 11 two-minute original adventures for mobile phones in 2007, which also gave the studio an exercise in working with the new characters in preparation for the series.  Three of them first aired on May 2, 2008 on Nicktoons Network during the premiere of Speed Racer: The Next Generation during commercials. Some of the clips are named "A Silver Tongue is fine, but Silence is Golden", "Two Heads Are Not Always Better than One", and "Out of Sight? You're Out of your Mind!", after each of the fortune cookie fortunes that appear at the beginning of every short.  The last eight were to be broadcast in 2009.

Episodes

Shorts (2008)

Series 1 (2008–09)
Season one began on June 27, 2008 on Nicktoons Network and ended on June 28, 2009.

Ratings
Episode 1 garnered 571,063 viewers. Episode 2 garnered 593,000 viewers. By episode 3, it garnered  over 1.5 million viewers. It continued to stay #1 on Nicktoons Network until Wolverine and the X-Men garnered over 3.1 million viewers with its first episode. Three Delivery then became #2. It then dropped to #3 on Nicktoons Network ratings due to Avatar: The Last Airbender hitting #2 above Three Delivery. But it has garnered over 4.7 million viewers and has stayed at the top.

References

External links
 

2000s American animated television series
2008 American television series debuts
2009 American television series endings
2000s Canadian animated television series
2008 Canadian television series debuts
2009 Canadian television series endings
American children's animated adventure television series
American children's animated fantasy television series
American children's animated action television series
American flash animated television series
Canadian children's animated adventure television series
Canadian children's animated fantasy television series
Canadian children's animated action television series
Canadian flash animated television series
Anime-influenced Western animated television series
YTV (Canadian TV channel) original programming
Nicktoons (TV network) original programming
Martial arts television series
Animated television series about orphans
Animated television series about siblings
English-language television shows